Cteniloricaria napova is a species of catfish in the family Loricariidae. It is native to South America, where it occurs in the upper Paru de Oeste River basin in Suriname. The species reaches 12.9 cm (5.1 inches) in standard length and is believed to be a facultative air-breather. Its specific name, napova, is derived from the Tiriyó language and means "thank you", honoring the Tiriyó people of Sipaliwini District for collecting and providing specimens of the species.

References 

Fish described in 2012

Fish of Suriname
Harttiini
Catfish of South America